The men's road race at the 1928 UCI Road World Championships was the second edition of the event. The race took place on Thursday 16 August 1928 in Budapest, Hungary. The race was won by Georges Ronsse of Belgium.

Final classification

References

Men's Road Race
UCI Road World Championships – Men's road race